The Widderfeld is a mountain in the Emmental Alps, located west of the Pilatus in Central Switzerland. The summit lies on the border between the cantons of Obwalden and Lucerne. The tripoint between the cantons of Lucerne, Obwalden and Nidwalden (1,920 m) lies 300 m north of the summit.

References

External links
 Widderfeld on Hikr

Mountains of the Alps
Mountains of Obwalden
Mountains of the canton of Lucerne
Lucerne–Obwalden border
Emmental Alps
Mountains of Switzerland